Beech Mountain is a town in both Avery and Watauga counties in the U.S. state of North Carolina. As of the 2010 census, the town population was 320. The town is located atop Beech Mountain and is the highest town east of the Rocky Mountains at 5,506 ft (1,678 m) in elevation.

The town relies heavily on tourism, with the population swelling as high as 5,000 in the summer, and to 10,000 during the peak of ski season. The abundance of outdoor activities, mild summer temperatures (compared to the rest of the southeast), and ski resort make it a popular location for people in the Carolinas, Georgia and Florida to own both summer and winter vacation homes.

Geography
Beech Mountain is located in Avery and Watauga counties, North Carolina.  Beech Mountain is located at  (36.206374, -81.883115).  According to the United States Census Bureau, the town has a total area of 6.7 sq mi (17.4 km), all land.

At an elevation of 5,506 feet (1,678 m), Beech Mountain is the highest incorporated community east of the Mississippi River.  Beech Mountain Ski Resort is one of very few ski areas operating in the Southeastern United States.

Demographics

As of the census of 2000, there were 310 people, 145 households, and 95 families residing in the town. The population density was 46.6 people per square mile (18.0/km). There were 1,868 housing units at an average density of 280.8 per square mile (108.5/km). The racial makeup of the town was 97.42% White, and 2.58% from two or more races. Hispanics or Latinos of any race were 0.97% of the population.

There were 145 households, out of which 15.9% had children under the age of 18 living with them, 59.3% were married couples living together and 33.8% were non-families. 21.4% of all households were made up of individuals, and 9.0% had someone living alone who was 65 years of age or older. The average household size was 2.14 and the average family size was 2.45.

The age distribution was 12.6% under the age of 18, 5.8% from 18 to 24, 24.8% from 25 to 44, 33.9% from 45 to 64, and 22.9% who were 65 years of age or older. The median age was 51 years. For every 100 females, there were 108.1 males. For every 100 females age 18 and over, there were 106.9 males.

The median income for a household in the town was $47,500, and the median income for a family was $52,813. Males had a median income of $32,031 versus $22,000 for females. The per capita income for the town was $26,799. About 2.8% of families and 8.5% of the population were below the poverty line, including none of those under the age of eighteen or sixty-five or over.

Climate
Beech Mountain has a humid continental climate (Dfb), and is the coldest town in North Carolina as well as all of Southeastern US, with winters comparable to coastal New England and summers far cooler than the surrounding Piedmont and even other mountain towns. Summers are typically mild and rainy, with some cooler and warmer days sprinkled in. Winter temperatures are cold and very snowy, with daily highs around freezing and lows in the teens, though above freezing winter highs tend to keep the snowpack down.

Recreation

Beech Mountain has become known as a recreational mecca on the East Coast and is the main driver in its economy. Due to its high altitude, the cool summer temperatures make it an ideal place to escape the heat of the flat lands and the ample snowfall during the winter allows for over 3 months of skiing and snowboarding each year.

Hiking 
Beech Mountain has over 28 miles of dedicated hiking trail within the town limits. Popular trails include Upper and Lower Pond Creek, which traverse along the banks of Pond Creek, and Grassy Gap Trail, which descends along Grassy Gap Creek to Buckeye Recreation Center. The Emerald Outback has become a popular hiking and trail running destination, boasting 11 miles of pristine trail mostly above 5,000' in altitude. Several overlooks exist facing the southward mountains in the trail system. Each summer, the recreation department provides guided hikes to view birds, flowers, plants, and other items along the trails.

Biking 
Biking on Beech Mountain has been a staple since the early days of the town. Cyclists enjoy both road cycling and mountain biking opportunities atop the mountain. The recreation department maintains the Emerald Outback trail system and has invested into several trails with jumps, berms, and other features. During the summer months, Beech Mountain Resort opens their downhill bike park, which is accessible via chair lift. Several competitions take place on the downhill trails each year. Beech Mountain is also known for its road cycling. Highway 184 on the front side of the mountain is one of the most difficult climbs in the southern United States. It was made famous during the 1990s as it was the queen stage of the now defunct Tour DuPont, as well as during Lance Armstrong's recovery from cancer treatment.

Fishing 
While the mountain does not contain the large rivers typically associated with mountain trout fishing, there is a plethora of places to cast a rod within the town limits. Over 3 miles of the streams on the mountain are stocked with trout from the NC Fish and Wildlife Service, as well as Buckeye Lake and Lake Coffey. Fish include brown, rainbow, and brook trout. Guided tours are available through the Buckeye Recreation Center, as well as single day fishing licenses specific to Beech Mountain. Each year in June, the Kiddo Fishing Derby attracts several kids to Lake Coffey as the season opens for trout fishing.

Skiing and snowboarding 
Beech Mountain was originally developed around the ski resort, Beech Mountain Resort. The resort was opened in 1967 and has expanded ever since. Currently, there are 17 trails and 8 lifts over 95 skiable acres. The mountain hosted large racing events during the 1970s that attracted several Olympians to the resort. After falling into disrepair at the turn of the century, the owners of the resort have begun making large capital improvements to bring the resort back to it prior grandeur. There is a wide range of terrain, including a beginner area, a terrain park with several jumps and features, more difficult terrain, and one of the top slopes in the south on the backside of the mountain in Oz Run.

Sledding and tubing 
Beech Mountain is the only municipality in the southern United States to operate a free public sledding hill. Located across from the town hall building, the sled hill is open all winter long to children under the age of 12. The hill is no longer supervised during business hours, which roughly coincide with daylight. Patrons must bring their own sleds, which can be brought from home, rented or purchased at nearby merchants. Also, be prepared to pay hourly metered parking (the hill is a bit steep & long to walk with small children), card accepted.

Beech Mountain Resort offers tubing, which users must purchase tickets in person for, only issued on the day of visit. Tubing tickets are sold in two hour blocks (times available based on weekday/weekend) but be aware that you actually get less because the tube lanes close at least 15 minutes prior to end of session. You can sign the waiver electronically online, which will save you time at the ticket booth.

Buckeye Recreation Center 
The Buckeye Recreation Center is an indoor facility dedicated to expanding the recreational needs of residents and visitors alike and is the central hub of the town recreation department. The center opened in 2005 and includes a full-size gymnasium, indoor tennis court, 2 indoor pickleball courts, meeting areas, fitness area with state-of-the-art equipment, kids playroom, an indoor walking track, and lobby with free WiFi. Outside of the building, there are 2 outdoor tennis courts, a softball field, a walking path, and large ropes playground. Additionally, the center rents out canoes, kayaks, and other water equipment for use in nearby Buckeye Lake. During the summer, the center hosts a daycamp for kids of all ages, as well as several other activities and events for residents and visitors alike.

Beech Mountain Club 
The Beech Mountain Club is a private club that originated as a homeowners association when the mountain was first developed. Today, memberships can be purchased through ownership of property on the mountain. The Club offers an 18-hole golf course, 10 Har-Tru tennis courts, a 25m pool, 5 pickleball courts, and an indoor fitness center. Due to the very infrequent nature of hot weather in the summer, the golf course boasts a "free round of golf" if the temperatures exceed 80 degrees. In the winter, the Club operates the Alpen Haus at the foot of the ski resort.

Other activities 
With 63 miles of low traffic town roads, Beech Mountain offers a great place for road running and walking. Several running races take place on the mountain each year. During the winter months, less traveled roads are not plowed, which allows for usage of cross country skis and snowshoes. These activities are also permitted on the town maintained trails. The Beech Mountain Resort also offers ice skating in the winter, as well as roller skating and disc golf in the summer months.

Notable people

 Ray Hicks, Appalachian storyteller
 Frank Proffitt, banjoist

See also

 Beech Mountain (geographical feature, with resort)
 Land of Oz (theme park)
 List of ski areas and resorts in the United States

References

External links
 Town of Beech Mountain
 Beech Mountain Chamber of Commerce
 Beech Mountain News
 Beech Mountain Ski Resort

Towns in North Carolina
Towns in Avery County, North Carolina
Towns in Watauga County, North Carolina